DXDN may refer to:

 DXDN-AM, an AM radio station broadcasting in Tagum
 DXDN-FM, an FM radio station broadcasting in Midsayap, branded as Kiss FM